Karen Irene Countryman-Roswurm (born June 5, 1980) is a Native American (Blackfoot) social worker, professor, and academic administrator who specializes in the field of human trafficking and other forms of exploitation. She is an associate professor in the school of social work at Wichita State University and the founder and executive director of the Wichita State University Center for Combating Human Trafficking (CCHT).

Early life and education 
When she was 13, Countryman-Roswurm's mother died and she subsequently spent her adolescence on the run, on the streets, and in and out of foster homes, and a children's home. Despite this, Countryman-Roswurm completed her GED and successfully became an emancipated minor from state custody at age 16. She is the only Kansas child to do so to this date. Following her emancipation, she was hired to be a street outreach peer counselor through the same children's home she had previously received services from.

Countryman-Roswurm received her undergraduate degree in social work in 2005, her masters social work degree in 2006, and her doctorate in community psychology in 2012, all from Wichita State University.

Career 
Countryman-Roswurm began working as a peer counselor in street outreach services and has since worked across the country as a therapist, in youth programs, community organizing, and advocating for vulnerable populations. Currently, Countryman-Roswurm serves as a tenured associate professor in the Wichita State University School of Social Work and as the Founding Executive Director of the Wichita State University Center for Combating Human Trafficking.

Much of Countryman-Roswurm's recent work has been advocating for survivors of sex trafficking in Kansas, and across the country, who have been unjustly criminalized.

Honors and awards 
2014: Inaugural Pat Ayars Mentoring Award given by the Wichita Business Journal
2015: The National Convening on Trafficking and Child Welfare in the White House
2017: Martin Luther King Jr., Education Award given by The Kansas African American Museum

References

External links
Fight the New Drug Interview, Truth About Porn, Karen Countryman-Roswurm, LMSW, Ph.D., 2019 
ConnectionPGH, Pursuing Youth Firm Persuasion: Combating Human Trafficking and the Criminalization of Kids in “Care”, 2018 
TEDx Cambridge University, The Power of Resilience, 2013. 
Emancipation Nation Podcast, The Misbranding and Misunderstandings of Trafficking and How Honoring the Person's Whole Life Opens the door to Serve Them Effectively, 2019

1980 births
Living people
Wichita State University alumni
Wichita State University faculty
American social workers
Social workers
Anti–human trafficking activists
American women academics
American academic administrators
21st-century American women
21st-century Native American women
21st-century Native Americans